Mornington Crescent is an improvisational comedy game featured in the BBC Radio 4 comedy panel show I'm Sorry I Haven't a Clue (ISIHAC), a series that satirises panel games.

The game consists of each panellist in turn announcing a landmark or street, most often a tube station on the London Underground system. The ostensible aim is to be the first to announce "Mornington Crescent", a station on the Northern line. Interspersed with the turns is humorous discussion amongst the panellists and host regarding the rules and legality of each move, as well as the strategy the panellists are using. The actual aim of the game is to entertain the other participants and listeners with amusing discussion of the fictional rules and strategies.

Origins 
Mornington Crescent first appeared in the opening episode of the sixth series of I'm Sorry I Haven't a Clue, broadcast on 22 August 1978.  Although five episodes transmitted in 1974–1975 are lost, Mornington Crescent seems to have made no appearance before 1978. It was played in every surviving episode of the sixth series.

The origins of the game are not clear. One claim is that it was invented by Geoffrey Perkins, who stated in an interview that Mornington Crescent was created as a non-game. Barry Cryer, a panellist on the programme since 1972, has said that Geoffrey Perkins did not invent the game, and that it had been around since the sixties. According to Chairman Humphrey Lyttelton, the game was invented to vex a series producer who was unpopular with the panellists. One day, the team members were drinking, when they heard him coming. "Quick," said one, "let's invent a game with rules he'll never understand."

A similar game called "Finchley Central" was described in the Spring 1969 issue of the mathematical magazine Manifold, edited by Ian Stewart and John Jaworski at the University of Warwick. Douglas Hofstadter referred to the article in his book Metamagical Themas. The game is referred to as an "English game" in an article on "non-games" as follows:
Two players alternate naming the stations of the London Underground. The first to say "Finchley Central" wins. It is clear that the "best" time to say "Finchley Central" is exactly before your opponent does. Failing that, it is good that he should be considering it. You could, of course, say "Finchley Central" on your second turn. In that case, your opponent puffs on his cigarette and says, "Well,..." Shame on you.

Gameplay on I'm Sorry I Haven't a Clue

The objective of Mornington Crescent is to give the appearance of a game of skill and strategy, with complex and long-winded rules and strategies, to parody games in which similarly circuitous systems have evolved. The apparent rules are fictional, and its appeal to audiences lies in the ability of players to create an entertaining illusion of competitive gameplay.

Humorous variations to the rules have been introduced to games. Humphrey Lyttelton would describe special rules to apply to that session, such as "Trumpington's Variations" or "Tudor Court Rules", so that almost every episode featuring Mornington Crescent introduced a variant. In one of them, first introduced in North Yorkshire, a player whose movement is blocked is considered to be "in Nidd" and is forced to remain in place for the next three moves. This tends to block the other players, putting them into Nidd as well and causing a roadblock. In one episode, every player ended up in Nidd and the rule had to be suspended so that the round could continue.

Over time, the destinations named by the panellists expanded beyond the Underground, in accordance with various regional expansions of the game. ISIHAC is recorded around the United Kingdom, and the game is occasionally modified accordingly. There have been versions in Slough and Leeds, as well as one in Scotland, played during the Edinburgh Fringe arts festival and a 2016 recording in Glasgow (where the name was changed to "Morningside Crescent") and another variation played at recordings in Wales (called "Morganstown Crescent"). In one episode, recorded in Luton, panellists named locations as far afield as the Place de l'Étoile in Paris, Nevsky Prospekt in St. Petersburg, and Pennsylvania Avenue in Washington, DC. However, a move to Luton High Street was ruled invalid for being too remote. In other episodes, an attempt was supposedly made to expand the territory to Manhattan (via Heathrow and JFK) but there was some disagreement as to whether or not the New York City Subway system was suited to the game. References have been made in various episodes of ISIHAC to international versions of the game, including "Mornington Croissant", supposedly based on the Paris Métro, and "Mornington Peninsula", the Australian variant. At least one full game of Mornington Croissant was played on air.

A regular feature that introduces Mornington Crescent is a letters section which begins with the chairman's comments ("I notice from the sheer weight of this week's postbag, we've received a little over no letters" and "I see from the number of letters raining down on us this week that the Scrabble factory has exploded again"). The selected letter each week is invariably from "A Mrs. Trellis of North Wales", whose incoherent letters usually mistake the chairman for another Radio 4 presenter or media personality. "Dear Libby," (she writes), "why oh why ... very nearly spells YOYO", or "Dear Mr. Titchmarsh, never let them tell you that size isn't important. My aunt told me that, but then all my new wallpaper fell off."

Further popularity 

Finchley Central and Mornington Crescent have been played as a play-by-mail pastime, and in the 1980s were played by post in a number of play-by-mail magazines. One format involved a series of elimination rounds, with everyone except the winner of the current round going forward onto the next. A "type-in" computer version of the game for the BBC Microcomputer was included in the April 1985 edition of The Micro User. Mornington Crescent can now be played online, in the spirit of the radio series. Games are played by fans on Usenet, in diverse web forums, and on the London Underground itself. A Facebook application has also been produced.

When Mornington Crescent Underground station was reopened in 1998 after six years of closure for lift repairs, London Transport invited the Clue team to perform an opening ceremony. A memorial plaque to the late Willie Rushton, one of the show's longest-serving panelists, was installed at the station in 2002.

Spin-offs and publications 
At Christmas 1984, Radio 4 broadcast a special programme, Everyman's Guide to Mornington Crescent, a "two-part documentary" on the history of the game and its rules, presented by Raymond Baxter. At the end of part one (concentrating on the history), it was announced that part two (about the rules) had been postponed due to "scheduling difficulties".

Another documentary was broadcast on Christmas Eve 2005. It was named In Search of Mornington Crescent, and narrated by Andrew Marr. This has since also been released on a BBC Audiobook CD.

Two books of rules and history have been published, The Little Book of Mornington Crescent (2001), by Graeme Garden, Tim Brooke-Taylor, Barry Cryer and Humphrey Lyttelton, and Stovold's Mornington Crescent Almanac (2001), by Graeme Garden.

A board game (of sorts) variant has been developed by web developer Kevan Davis and its rules are available on his website.

A version of Mornington Crescent is played semi-regularly between Max Rushden and Barry Glendenning on sports radio station Talksport. This version of the game, 'Culverhouse', sees the two presenters name footballers back and forth, with the winner being the first to name Ian Culverhouse.

Cultural references 

 The Steep Approach to Garbadale, by Iain Banks, mentions Mornington Crescent as a game created by the fictional company Wopuld Ltd., described as being "based on the map of the London underground with a complicated double-level board".
 A version of the game was featured in an XKCD comic on April Fools' Day (1 April) 2018.
 Mornington Crescent is the title of a 1995 album by the band My Life Story.
 The code for the first ever Mornington Crescent computer game, on a BBC Micro, was presented on p154 of the April 1985 edition of The Micro User, an early computer magazine. Due to space restrictions, the rules for the game were not published but were promised for the next month's edition, along with an explanation by a member of the Society for the Support of Mornington Crescent, Dr. Richard Taylor-Fischel. Unfortunately, in that edition on the Letters page, p121, he took umbrage at the modifications to the game that had been necessary to produce a computer program and consequently withdrew his collaboration, using the name Dr. R. T. Fischel PhD and bar. 
 The chapter titles of Whispers Under Ground by Ben Aaronovitch form a game of Mornington Crescent.

See also
 Calvinball
 Guyball from the sitcom Green Wing
 List of games with concealed rules
 Numberwang from the television show That Mitchell and Webb Look
 Zendo

References

External links
The BBC Radio 4 Mornington Crescent message board
H2G2 Mornington Crescent Appreciation Society
A list of variations mentioned in ISIHAC games
Automated version of the game, against a server, following the short rules and rule 7b.
Encyclopaedia Morningtonia Wiki and the original
Mornington Crescent Game Archive dataset.

I'm Sorry I Haven't a Clue
British radio game shows
1978 radio programme debuts
Comedy games
London Underground in popular culture
Games with concealed rules
Radio game shows with incorrect disambiguation